Prosoplus australis is a species of beetle in the family Cerambycidae. It was described by Xavier Montrouzier in 1861. It is known from New Caledonia.

References

Prosoplus
Beetles described in 1861
Insects of New Caledonia
Beetles of Oceania